Betti is a surname. Notable people with the name include:

Biagio Betti (1535–1605), Italian painter 
Emilio Betti (1890–1968), Italian jurist, philosopher and theologian 
Enrico Betti (1823–1892), Italian mathematician 
Freda Betti (1924–1979), French opera singer 
Henri Betti (1917–2005), French composer and pianist 
Laura Betti (1927–2004), Italian actress 
Liliana Betti (1937–1998), Italian screenwriter and director
Luca Betti (born 1978), Italian rally driver
Natale Betti (1826–1888), Italian painter 
Paulo Betti (born 1952), Brazilian stage, film and television actor 
Priscilla Betti (born 1989), French singer and actress
Riccardo Betti (born 1963), professor of Mechanical Engineering, Physics and Astronomy at the University of Rochester
Sigismondo Betti (1699–1777), Italian painter
Ugo Betti (1892–1953), Italian judge and author 
Umberto Betti (1922–2009), Italian Cardinal of the Roman Catholic Church

See also
Betty (surname)
Betti (given name)

Italian-language surnames